Lianne Tan (born 20 November 1990) is a Belgian badminton player. She competed for Belgium at the 2012 London, 2016 Rio, and at the 2020 Tokyo Olympics. She was selected to participate in the 2012 Summer Olympics, together with her brother Yuhan. In 2015, she won the silver medal in the European Games in Baku, Azerbaijan.

Personal life 
Tan's father, Hank Tan, is Indonesian Chinese, while her mother, Maria Meyers, is Belgian (Flemish), and a native of Bilzen. Her parents met when her father came to Belgium to study dentistry.

Achievements

European Games 
Women's singles

European Junior Championships 
Girls' singles

BWF International Challenge/Series (9 titles, 7 runners-up) 
Women's singles

  BWF International Challenge tournament
  BWF International Series tournament
  BWF Future Series tournament

References

External links 
 
 
 
 
 

1990 births
Living people
People from Bilzen
Sportspeople from Limburg (Belgium)
Belgian people of Indonesian descent
Belgian people of Chinese descent
Belgian female badminton players
Badminton players at the 2012 Summer Olympics
Badminton players at the 2016 Summer Olympics
Badminton players at the 2020 Summer Olympics
Olympic badminton players of Belgium
Badminton players at the 2015 European Games
Badminton players at the 2019 European Games
European Games medalists in badminton
European Games silver medalists for Belgium